Garner News was a weekly newspaper based in Fuquay-Varina, North Carolina.  It covered the town of Garner, North Carolina.  It closed in 2013.

References

Defunct newspapers published in North Carolina
Mass media in Wake County, North Carolina